The Department of Revenue is a department of the Wyoming state government responsible for the collection of mineral and excise taxes as well as valuing property and the wholesale distribution of alcoholic beverages and enforcement of liquor laws. Personal or corporate income taxes are not levied.

State alcohol agencies of the United States
State agencies of Wyoming